Match point may refer to:

 Match point (tennis), won if the player in the lead scores 
 Matchpoint scoring, in duplicate bridge
 Match Point, a 2005 film directed by Woody Allen
 Matchpoint (game show), a 1990 British game show